Thomas F. Sheppard (born May 23, 1969) is an American sports executive who is the President of Basketball Operations and general manager of the Washington Wizards of the National Basketball Association (NBA). A native of New Mexico, he attended New Mexico State University and played for their football team before graduating in 1991. 

Sheppard's NBA career began upon joining the Denver Nuggets' public relations department in 1994. He later joined the Wizards as an assistant executive under Ernie Grunfeld in 2003 and was promoted to general manager following his dismissal in 2019. Sheppard also serves as their team president.

Early life and career
Sheppard was born in Albuquerque, New Mexico, where he attended St. Pius X High School. Sheppard attended New Mexico State University, where he played three years for the New Mexico State Aggies football team, before graduating in 1991. Sheppard started his career in sports management, when he accepted a job with the Aggies as a graduate assistant to the sports information director.

Sheppard would later move to the University of Nevada-Las Vegas, where he served as the sports information director for the UNLV Rebels for three seasons.

Executive career

Denver Nuggets
Sheppard was hired by the Denver Nuggets in 1994 as the team's senior director of team services and player relations. Sheppard was responsible for overseeing the team's public relations department, in addition to scouting players in the high school, college and international ranks.

Washington Wizards
Sheppard was hired by the Wizards in 2003, serving as the team's vice-president of basketball operations under the newly hired president and general manager Ernie Grunfeld.

Sheppard served in various capacities with the franchise and was responsible for the team's rebuilding efforts, which saw the Wizards move on from Gilbert Arenas and placing a greater emphasis on drafting and developing players. Sheppard was considered influential in the team's decision to build around both John Wall and Bradley Beal.

Sheppard was appointed the interim general manager of the Wizards following Grunfeld's dismissal on April 2, 2019. He was later named to the position full-time on July 19, 2019. In November 2021, he signed a multi-year contract extension and was also given the title of team president.

Personal life
Sheppard now serves as an adjunct professor of sports management at Georgetown University, after joining the university's staff as a guest lecturer in 2009.

References

External links

1969 births
Living people
American sports executives and administrators
Denver Nuggets executives
National Basketball Association general managers
New Mexico State Aggies football players
People from Albuquerque, New Mexico
Washington Wizards executives